China Civil Engineering Construction Corporation Ltd. (abbreviation CCECC) was established in June 1979 under the approval of the State Council of the People's Republic of China.

It performs international contracting and economic cooperation, CCECC has been developed from the earlier Foreign Aid Department of the Ministry of Railways (with the experience of executing the biggest foreign-aid project of China, the TAZARA) into a large-scale state-owned enterprise for project contracting.

Its business scope expands from international contracting for railway construction to civil engineering design & consultancy, real estate development, trading, industrial investment and hotel management as well. The business activities of CCECC have expanded to over 40 countries and regions where more than 20 overseas offices or subsidiaries have been established. With its excellent performance and high quality in services, CCECC has been listed among the world's top 255 international contractors for many years and ranked consecutively among the first 70 in recent years by the Engineering News Record "ENR".

History
From 1970 to 1975, the foreign aid department of the Ministry of Railways, helped build the TAZARA Railway in Tanzania and Zambia. The 1,860 km railway in Africa was China's single largest foreign aid project.
On 1 June 1979 China Civil Engineering Construction Corporation was incorporated, upon the approval by the State Council of China.
After approval by the State Economic and Trade Commission and the Ministry of Railways, China Civil Engineering Construction Corporation was reformed into Group on December 26, 1996, With the China Civil Engineering Construction Corporation as the core enterprise, and simultaneously changed its name into Group (hereinafter called CCECC).
CCECC completed the disconnection with the Ministry of Railway in September 2000, and meanwhile was attached to the Industry Commission of Central Enterprise of the China Communist Party Central Committee.
At the beginning of 2003, CCECC was, along with other 195 central enterprise, under the direct leadership of the State-owned Assets Supervision and Administration Commission of the State Council.
CCECC underwent strategic reform with the China Railway Construction Corporation in the form of a merger in September 2003 based on the spirit of the document “The Written Replay on the reform of the China Railway Construction Corporation and the China Civil Engineering Construction Corporation (document No.: SA Reform [2003] No. 153)” issued by the State-owned Assets Supervision and Administration Commission of the State Council.
CCECC, at present, is the member of the China Chamber of International Commerce, the Vice Chairmen level unit of the China International Contractors Association and the Director of the China International Engineering Consulting Association.

Project 

In 2009, CCECC completed both bores of the 8.6 km Carmel Tunnels in Haifa, Israel.

In 2014, CCECC is building a double track standard gauge railway from Lagos to Kano, in Nigeria.

In 2014, CCECC completed both bores of the 4.6 km Gilon tunnel on the 23 km Acre–Carmiel line under construction in northern Israel.

In 2014, CCECC won a contract to build Carlebach underground station of Tel Aviv Light Rail.

In 2015, CCECC won a contract to build underground stations and to bore tunnels of eastern part of Tel Aviv Light Rail.

In 2019, CCECC won a contract to build a regional train line to connect Bogota to its neighbouring suburbs, known as RegioTram.

References

External links 
  (Chinese and English)

Companies based in Beijing
1979 establishments in China